Tally-ho is a phrase used in hunting.

Tally Ho and Tallyho may refer to:

Places
 Tally-Ho Plantation House, a home in Louisiana
 Tally Ho Township in Granville County, North Carolina
 Tally Ho, Victoria, a locality within the suburb of Burwood East, Victoria, Australia
Tallyho, West Virginia, a community in the United States
 Aladdin (hotel and casino), opened in 1962 as the Tallyho Hotel
 Tallahassee, Florida, often called "tally ho" by Florida natives

Music
 Tally Ho! (album), an album by Luke Vibert under the alias Wagon Christ
"Tally Ho!", a single by The Clean

Other uses
 Tally-Ho (rolling papers), a brand of cigarette rolling paper sold in Australia
Tally Ho (yacht), a British yacht
HMS Tally-Ho, a World War II-era British submarine
 The Tally Ho, the fictional daily newspaper featured in the UK television series The Prisoner